Eđšeg is a city type chateau castle located in Novi Sad, Vojvodina, Serbia. It was designed by architect Molnár György and built by Karl Lehrer in 1890.

Name
The name Eđšeg comes from the Hungarian word Egység, meaning "Unity" in English or "Jedinstvo" (Јединство) in Serbian, which was also the name of a sports society that had function in the chateau after World War II.

History
Edšeg was built at what was once the outskirts of Novi Sad, on the Futog Road, in today's Antona Čehova Street. It was raised by the shooting club ("Societas Jaculatoria" or "Građansko streljačko društvo") from Novi Sad. Designed and built in 1890 on the centenary of the shooting society's founding, it was designed by the famous architect György Molnár in then popular eclectic style, while the Karl Lehrer built it.

After World War II, the original owner of the shooting club was convicted by the communist government of Yugoslavia for alleged collaboration with the Hungarian occupiers and all his possessions were confiscated and nationalized on 6 December 1945. The building was then given by the government to be used by the shooting club "Jedinstvo" (Јединство) for which the chateau was named after. Afterwards it was used by many others groups, but it lost its use at the end of the 20th century.

For a long while, the chateau was left in disrepair, with many homeless people and drug addicts.

In 2007, the building was saved from demolition by declaring it a cultural monuments of great importance and put under the protection of the State of Serbia. 

While the roof was preventatively reconstructed in 2000, so as to not collapse and to keep the interior from being effected by the weather, the full reconstruction took place between September 2010 and June 2012, with funds given by the City of Novi Sad. The construction works were supervised by the Institute for the Protection of Cultural Monuments, and the amount of money invested in its reconstruction was 55 million Serbian dinars. It was inaugurated on 15 September 2014. 

On 8 September 2018, Chateau Edšeg has become a cultural center (Kulturna Stanica Eđšeg), and is now the ideal venue for cultural and artistic events, concerts, competitions, theatre performances, recitals, etc. It was one of the important pillars for conducting cultural events in 2022, when Novi Sad became the European Capital of Culture.

Building
Designed in the eclectic style, it consists of three side halls and one large ballroom. The interior of the main hall is richly decorated and the ceiling is painted with hunting and village life scenes, with stylized floral and geometric motifs. Pilasters have Corinthian captains, and the interior is brightly lit. The chateau has a central entry tower, and on each side a symmetrical facade with three windowed archways. The hallway is brightly lit, with light ochre, white, and gold colors.

After the reconstructions, the chateau received modern electrical installations, floor heating (powered by modern geothermal energy accumulators located in the courtyard), built in air condition, decorative and functional lighting, as well as emergency installations in case of a fire or theft.

References

External links
 

Buildings and structures in Novi Sad
Castles in Serbia
Manor houses in Serbia
Architecture in Serbia
Cultural Monuments of Great Importance (Serbia)